The 8 cm kanon PL vz. 37 (Anti-aircraft Gun Model 37) was a Czech anti-aircraft gun used during the Second World War. Those weapons captured after the German occupation of Czechoslovakia in March 1939 were taken into Wehrmacht service as the 7.65 cm Flak M 37(t). 97 were in service during the Munich Crisis in September 1938 of which Slovakia seized one when it declared independence six months later.

Notes

References
 Gander, Terry and Chamberlain, Peter. Weapons of the Third Reich: An Encyclopedic Survey of All Small Arms, Artillery and Special Weapons of the German Land Forces 1939-1945. New York: Doubleday, 1979

External links

World War II anti-aircraft guns
Anti-aircraft guns of Czechoslovakia
76 mm artillery
Military equipment introduced in the 1930s